Montford is a civil parish in Shropshire, England.  It contains 20 listed buildings that are recorded in the National Heritage List for England.  Of these, two are at Grade II*, the middle of the three grades, and the others are at Grade II, the lowest grade.  The parish contains the villages and smaller settlements of Broomfields, Montford,  Montford Bridge, and Shrawardine, and the surrounding countryside.  Most of the listed buildings are houses, cottages and farmhouses, the earliest of which are timber framed or have timber-framed cores.  The other listed buildings include the remains of a castle, two churches, a tomb in a churchyard, two bridges, three milestones, a former toll house, and a former lodge.
 

Key

Buildings

References

Citations

Sources

Lists of buildings and structures in Shropshire